Liparis simmondsii, commonly known as the coastal sprite orchid, is a plant in the orchid family and is endemic to Queensland. It is a terrestrial orchid with two or three egg-shaped leaves and between three and fifteen deep reddish purple flowers with a green column. It grows in near-coastal rainforest.

Description
The column is green. Flowering occurs between December and February.

Taxonomy and naming
Liparis simmondsii was first formally described in 1891 by Frederick Manson Bailey and the description was published in the Department of Agriculture Queensland, Botany Bulletin. The specific epithet (simmondsii) honours John Howard Simmonds.

Distribution and habitat
The coastal sprite orchid grows in coastal rainforest between Fraser Island and Maroochydore. There is a doubtful record from the upper Brunswick River in northern New South Wales.

References 

simmondsii
Orchids of Queensland
Plants described in 1891